Sean McKenna may refer to:

Sean McKenna (ice hockey) (born 1962), former professional ice hockey player
Sean McKenna (footballer) (born 1987), Scottish footballer
Shaun McKenna (born 1957), English writer
Sean McKenna (cyclist) (born 1994), Irish cyclist